BrainMaps is an NIH-funded interactive zoomable high-resolution digital brain atlas and virtual microscope that is based on more than 140 million megapixels (140 terabytes) of scanned images of serial sections of both primate and non-primate brains and that is integrated with a high-speed database for querying and retrieving data about brain structure and function over the internet.

Currently featured are complete brain atlas datasets for 16 species; a few of which are: Macaca mulatta, Chlorocebus aethiops, Felis silvestris catus, Mus musculus, Rattus norvegicus, and Tyto alba.

The project's principal investigator was UC Davis neuroscientist Ted Jones from 2005 through 2011, after which the role was taken by W. Martin Usrey.

Description 
BrainMaps uses multiresolution image formats for representing massive brain images, and a dHTML/Javascript front-end user interface for image navigation, both similar to the way that Google Maps works for geospatial data.

BrainMaps is one of the most massive online neuroscience databases and image repositories and features the highest-resolution whole brain atlas ever constructed.

Extensions to interactive 3-dimensional visualization have been developed through OpenGL-based desktop applications.   Freely available image analysis tools enable end-users to datamine online images at the sub-neuronal level.   BrainMaps has been used in both research  and didactic settings.

Additional images

See also
 List of neuroscience databases
 Human Brain Project
 NeuroNames
 Mouse brain

References

External links

 BrainMaps.org (official website)
 BrainMaps featured in Science Magazine
 BrainMaps images featured in Discover Magazine article, "10 Unsolved Mysteries Of The Brain"
 BrainMaps-related Publications (archived 9 May 2012)

Online databases
Anatomy websites
Biological databases